The Australian bagmoth (Cebysa leucotelus) or lichen bag moth is a moth of the Psychidae family. It is found in New Zealand and the southern half of Australia (Tasmania, Victoria and Western Australia).

The larvae build a protective bag like the other bag moths in the family Psychidae, and feed on lichen and algae.

The adult female moth has black wings with yellow wingtips and patches, but they do not expand properly, so she is not able to fly. Females are often mistaken for beetles or wasps.

The male has a similar pattern and colouring, more brown and cream, and no iridescence. His wings are fully developed and adult males can fly normally. Neither male nor female ever eat, and live only long enough to mate and produce eggs.

Lichen bag moths arrived in New Zealand from Australia in 1981 and have been gradually spreading across the country.

References

External links

Australian Caterpillars

Psychidae
Moths of New Zealand
Moths described in 1854